"Leader of the Pack" is a 1964 pop song recorded by The Shangri-Las, and it may also refer to:

 Leader of the Pack (album), the 1965 album containing the single
 Leader of the Pack (musical), based on life and music of Ellie Greenwich
 Leader of the Pack (Sam Smith song), a track on the 2017 album The Thrill of It All by Sam Smith
 "Leader of the Pack", episode of Highlander (season 4)
 "Leader of the Pack", episode of the animated television series Gargoyles
 Cesar Millan's Leader of the Pack, documentary television series

See also
Alpha (ethology)